Synopiidae is a family of amphipods belonging to the order Amphipoda.

Genera

Genera:
 Austrosyrrhoe Barnard, 1925
 Bruzelia Boeck, 1871
 Bruzeliopsis Chevreux, 1911

References

Amphipoda
Crustacean families